Hurricane Township is a township in Carroll County, in the U.S. state of Missouri.

Hurricane Township took its name from Big Hurricane Creek.

References

Townships in Missouri
Townships in Carroll County, Missouri